In enzymology, a guanosine deaminase is an enzyme that catalyzes the chemical reaction

guanosine + H2O  xanthosine + NH3

Thus, the two substrates of this enzyme are guanosine and H2O, whereas its two products are xanthosine and NH3.

This enzyme belongs to the family of hydrolases, those acting on carbon-nitrogen bonds other than peptide bonds, specifically in cyclic amidines.  The systematic name of this enzyme class is guanosine aminohydrolase. This enzyme is also called guanosine aminase.

References

 

EC 3.5.4
Enzymes of unknown structure